Homer (also Goddard or Slabtown) is an unincorporated community in central Walker Township, Rush County, in the U.S. state of Indiana. Although Homer is unincorporated, it has a post office, with the ZIP code of 46146.

History
Homer was originally called Slabtown, and under the latter name had its start around 1850 when a sawmill was established at that point.

A post office was established under the name Goddard in 1840 and was discontinued in 1852. Another post office with the name Homer ran from 1854 to 2000.

Geography
It lies along State Road 44, west-southwest of the city of Rushville, the county seat of Rush County. Its elevation is 935 feet (285 m), and it is located at  (39.5781027, -85.5780295).

Notable people
Marjorie Pebworth, Illinois legislator, was born in Homer.

References

Unincorporated communities in Rush County, Indiana
Unincorporated communities in Indiana